The Irish presidential election determines who serves as the President of Ireland, the head of state of Ireland. The last election took place on 26 October 2018. Where only one candidate is nominated, that candidate is declared elected without a ballot; this has occurred on six occasions.

Procedure
Presidential elections are conducted in line with Article 12 of the Constitution and under the Presidential Elections Act 1993, as amended. An election is ordinarily held not more than 60 days before the scheduled ending of the incumbent's seven-year term of office. In case of a casual vacancy (by death, resignation or impeachment) an election is held within 60 days. The dates during which candidates may be nominated and the date of the election are fixed by an order made by the Minister for Housing, Planning and Local Government.

All Irish citizens may vote in presidential elections if they have the right to vote in elections to Dáil Éireann (the lower house of the Oireachtas or parliament). The voting age is eighteen. The Dáil electoral register is based on residency within a geographical Dáil constituency, so that those living abroad may not vote, except diplomats and military posted overseas. Resident UK citizens may vote in Dáil elections but not presidential elections. A proposed constitutional amendment would give non-resident citizens a vote in presidential elections.

Elections are conducted by means of the instant-runoff voting, which is the single-winner analogue of the single transferable vote used in other Irish elections. The constitution calls the system "proportional representation by means of the single transferable vote", although a single-seat election cannot be proportional.

To qualify, candidates must:
be a citizen of Ireland,
be at least 35 years of age, and
be nominated by:
at least twenty of the 220 serving members of the Houses of the Oireachtas, or
at least four of the 31 county or city Councils, or
him- or herself, in the case of an incumbent or former president who has served one term.

The election order will declare the last day on which nominations may be received. If a member of the Oireachtas or a County or City council nominate more than one candidate, only the first nomination paper received from them will be deemed valid.

If there is only a single candidate they will be deemed elected without a poll. No one may serve as President for more than two terms.

Spending limits and donations
The spending limits in a Presidential election were reduced in 2011. The limit is €750,000 (was €1.3 million) and the amount a candidate can be reimbursed from the State is €200,000 (was €260,000). A candidate who is elected or who receives in excess of one quarter of the quota can seek reimbursement of their expenses.

The value of donations that may be accepted by candidates, their election agents and third parties at a presidential election is governed by law. In the case of candidates and presidential election agents, the maximum donation that may be accepted from a person (or a body) in a particular year cannot exceed €2,539. In the case of a third party, the maximum donation that may be accepted cannot exceed €6,348. The acceptance of donations from non-Irish citizens residing abroad is prohibited.

Results

Election dates and forms of nomination

Election dates in italics indicate dates which were set in the ministerial order, but where no election was held as only one candidate had been nominated.

See also
Politics of the Republic of Ireland
Elections in the Republic of Ireland
Irish presidential inauguration

References

External links
Website of the Presidential Returning Officer
Website of the President of Ireland
Presidential Elections Act 1993, as amended
Electoral (Amendment) Act 2011

 
Election